The 2019 Yau Tsim Mong District Council election was held on 24 November 2019 to elect all 20 members to the Yau Tsim Mong District Council.

The pro-Beijing parties suffered major setbacks in the election amid the massive pro-democracy protests, while a pro-democracy local political group Community March emerged as the largest party in the council with the pro-democrats controlling the council for the first time.

Overall election results
Before election:

Change in composition:

References

2019 Hong Kong local elections